Hyde County Courthouse may refer to:
 Hyde County Courthouse (North Carolina), listed on the National Register of Historic Places (NRHP) in North Carolina
 Hyde County Courthouse (South Dakota), NRHP-listed